Two-time defending champion Yui Kamiji and her partner Marjolein Buis defeated Jiske Griffioen and Aniek van Koot in the final, 6–2, 6–2 to win the women's doubles wheelchair tennis title at the 2016 Australian Open.

Kamiji and Jordanne Whiley were the two-time defending champions, but did not compete together. Whiley partnered Lucy Shuker, but was defeated in the semifinals by Griffioen and van Koot.

Seeds

Draw

References
Draw

Wheelchair Women's Doubles
2016 Women's Doubles